The 2018 Summit League men's soccer tournament, was the 25th edition of the tournament. It determined the Summit League's automatic berth into the 2018 NCAA Division I Men's Soccer Championship.

Denver won the Summit League title, making it their fifth title in the last six years. They defeated the defending Summit League champions, Omaha, 1–0.

Seeds

Bracket

Results

Semifinals

Final

Statistics

Goals

Assists

All Tournament Team

References

External links 
 Summit League Men's Soccer Tournament

Summit League Men's Soccer Tournament
Summit League Men's Soccer